Atawhai is a suburb of Nelson, New Zealand. It lies north of Nelson and is the location of Wakapuaka Cemetery, a burial place since 1861.

Geography

Atawhai covers an area of 4.53 km², including a land area of 4.53 km².

Miyazu Japanese Garden, a Japanese public garden and public reserve, is located in Atawhai.

Wakapuaka Cemetery is also located in the area.

Atawhai also has several local parks: Bayview Reserve, Corder Park, Frenchay Reserve, Montrose Reserve, Ngapua Reserve, Queen Elizabeth II Reserve, Te-Ata Reserve, Titoki Reserve, Tresillian Reserve and Werneth Reserve.

History and culture

The estimated population of Atawhai reached 2,000 in 1996.

It reached 2,220 in 2001, 2,208 in 2006, 2,556 in 2013, and 2,790 in 2018.

Whakatū Marae is located in Atawhai. It is the marae (meeting ground) of Ngāti Kōata, Ngāti Rārua, Ngāti Tama ki Te Tau Ihu, Ngāti Toa Rangatira and Te Atiawa o Te Waka-a-Māui. It includes the Kākāti wharenui (meeting house).

Demography

Atawhai had a population of 2,790 at the 2018 New Zealand census, an increase of 234 people (9.2%) since the 2013 census, and an increase of 582 people (26.4%) since the 2006 census. There were 1,131 households. There were 1,329 males and 1,461 females, giving a sex ratio of 0.91 males per female. The median age was 49.1 years (compared with 37.4 years nationally), with 477 people (17.1%) aged under 15 years, 291 (10.4%) aged 15 to 29, 1,425 (51.1%) aged 30 to 64, and 603 (21.6%) aged 65 or older.

Ethnicities were 92.5% European/Pākehā, 7.8% Māori, 1.4% Pacific peoples, 3.4% Asian, and 2.3% other ethnicities (totals add to more than 100% since people could identify with multiple ethnicities).

The proportion of people born overseas was 27.2%, compared with 27.1% nationally.

Although some people objected to giving their religion, 60.4% had no religion, 29.6% were Christian, 0.8% were Hindu, 0.2% were Muslim, 0.8% were Buddhist and 2.0% had other religions.

Of those at least 15 years old, 693 (30.0%) people had a bachelor or higher degree, and 303 (13.1%) people had no formal qualifications. The median income was $36,000, compared with $31,800 nationally. The employment status of those at least 15 was that 1,035 (44.7%) people were employed full-time, 447 (19.3%) were part-time, and 63 (2.7%) were unemployed.

Economy

In 2018, 6.9% worked in manufacturing, 8.5% worked in construction, 4.0% worked in hospitality, 4.6% worked in transport, 7.9% worked in education, and 13.5% worked in healthcare.

Transport

As of 2018, among those who commute to work, 73.5% drove a car, 3.4% rode in a car, 7.1% use a bike, and 7.1% walk or run. No one used public transport.

References

Suburbs of Nelson, New Zealand
Populated places in the Nelson Region
Populated places around Tasman Bay / Te Tai-o-Aorere